John J. Smith House was the home of John J. Smith from 1878 to 1893. Smith was an African American abolitionist, Underground Railroad contributor and politician, including three terms as a member of the Massachusetts House of Representatives. He also played a key role in rescuing Shadrach Minkins (a then slave) from federal custody, along with Lewis Hayden and others.

John J. Smith 
Born free in Richmond, Virginia, John J. Smith (1820–1906) moved to Boston in the late 1840s. Smith was an African American abolitionist leader who helped people escape slavery on the Underground Railroad. He was also a recruiting officer for the all-black 5th Cavalry during the Civil War and then a three-term member of the Massachusetts House of Representatives.

In the early 1870s, his daughter Elizabeth Smith started teaching at the Phillips School and was probably the first African American to teach in an integrated Boston public school.

Black Heritage Trail 
The house is a Boston African American historical site located on the Black Heritage Trail in Beacon Hill.

The National Park Service wrote:
The historic buildings along today's Black Heritage Trail were the homes, businesses, schools and churches of a thriving black community that organized, from the nation's earliest years, to sustain those who faced local discrimination and national slavery, struggling toward the equality and freedom promised in America's documents of national liberty.

References

Shadrach Minkins
From Wikipedia, the free encyclopedia wrote:
He was hidden in an attic in Beacon Hill. Minkins escaped Massachusetts with the help of John J. Smith, Lewis Hayden and others.

External links
 Boston African American National Historic Site (NPS)

African-American history in Boston
History of Boston
Houses in Boston
Beacon Hill, Boston
Houses on the Underground Railroad